Donald Travis Stewart (born 1965), known professionally as Trav S.D., is an American author, journalist, playwright and stage performer. He has been called a leading figure in the New Vaudeville and Indie Theater movements.

Career
Originally from Rhode Island, Trav S.D. started out as a stand-up comedian and studied at Trinity Rep Conservatory in Providence before moving to New York City in 1988 to self-produce and perform in his own plays. In 1990 he worked as a personal and administrative assistant to the singer Tony Bennett. Following two years in the development office of the Big Apple Circus in 1995, he founded his company Mountebanks, a platform for producing original theatre pieces and vaudeville shows through his American Vaudeville Theatre. He first began to attract notice in 1998 as one of a number of Lower East Side “performance comedians” colloquially known as Art Stars, working at alternative night clubs and theatres such as Surf Reality, Collective Unconscious, and The Present Company. In 2001, he was featured in an Adam Gopnik article for The New Yorker about New Burlesque. which led to his first book.

Journalist
In 1999, Trav S.D. began contributing features and reviews to the Village Voice, Time Out New York, and American Theatre (where he was an Affiliated Writing Fellow in 2001, leading the magazine's September 11 coverage). He has also written for the New York Times, New York Sun, and Reason. From 2006 through 2009 he interviewed over 250 indie theatre artists on the Indie Theatre Now podcast for Nytheatre.com. In 2008 he launched the arts and culture blog Travalanche, which features biographies of vaudeville, burlesque, circus, sideshow and other variety arts performers and professionals, as well as related news, reviews, and commentary, endorsed as a resource by Dana Stevens on Slate.com.

Author
Trav S.D.'s first book No Applause, Just Throw Money: The Book That Made Vaudeville Famous, was released by Farrar, Straus & Giroux in 2005 and praised by Bette Midler in People Magazine, followed by Chain of Fools: Silent Comedy and Its Legacies from Nickelodeons to Youtube, published by Bear Manor Media in 2013 which was later cited by Jason Zinoman in The New York Times, and Rose's Royal Midgets and Other Little People of Vaudeville by Vaudevisuals Press in 2020.

Theatre
In 2014, Trav S.D. directed and produced the first-ever revival of the Marx Brothers' musical I'll Say She Is, in the New York International Fringe Festival.

Trav S.D.'s original plays and shows have been produced at Joe's Pub, La Mama, Theater for the New City, Dixon Place, Metropolitan Playhouse, The Brick Theater, and HERE Arts Center. His best known original stage work is Horseplay, a biographical show about Adah Isaacs Menken starring Molly Pope and Everett Quinton, presented at La Mama in 2015.  His playwriting has received the support of MacDowell, the Gerald R. Dodge Foundation, the Anna Sosenko Assist Trust, and the Arch and Bruce Brown Foundation. As a stage actor he has appeared in numerous productions with Untitled Theatre Company #61, including the 2006 American premiere of Vaclav Havel's Guardian Angel, Edward Einhorn's 2010 adaptation of Philip K. Dick's Do Androids Dream of Electric Sheep?, and the titular role in 2018's The Resistible Rise of J.R. Brinkley.

Personal 
Trav S.D. has been married twice. From 1992 to 2008 he was married to Susan Monagan, an arts administrator and daughter of U.S. Congressman John S. Monagan. In 2016 he married illustrator Carolyn Raship.

References

External links

Trav S.D. on IMDB
Interview on "The Sound of Young America", December 2005

American entertainers
1965 births
Living people